The 2015 Honda Indy Toronto was an open-wheel motorsport event held at Exhibition Place in Toronto, Ontario, Canada over June 12–14, 2015. The event marked the 29th annual edition of the Toronto Indy, and the tenth round of the 2015 IndyCar Series season. The headline race on the Sunday was the 31st IndyCar race to be held at the  street circuit.

Josef Newgarden led home teammate Luca Filippi for a CFH Racing 1–2 finish, with the podium completed by Team Penske driver Hélio Castroneves. Championship leader Juan Pablo Montoya finished seventh, but his championship lead was reduced to twenty-seven by his Penske teammate Will Power, who finished fourth.

Race background
Due to Toronto hosting the 2015 Pan American and Parapan American Games, the race – held traditionally in mid-July – was moved to June to avoid conflicting with the games. Exhibition Place was unavailable in July and August as it will be converted into Pan Am Park, in order to host various games events including beach volleyball, gymnastics and cycling.

Honda Indy Toronto organizers had begun discussions with Canadian Tire Motorsport Park about moving the IndyCar race to its permanent motorsports facility located north of Bowmanville, Ontario for one year in the event that a replacement date at Exhibition Place could not be found. It would have been the first IndyCar race to have been held at the venue formerly known as Mosport since the 1978 Molson Diamond Indy, won by Danny Ongais.

An agreement was eventually made to host the race in June following the cancellation of the Grand Prix of Houston, with the Toronto Indy set to return to July for 2016.

The weekend also included races for Indy Lights, the Pro Mazda Championship, the U.S. F2000 National Championship, SPEED Energy Formula Off-Road Super Trucks, IMSA GT3 Cup Challenge Canada and the Canadian Touring Car Championship.

Report

Free practice
Two practice sessions were held on Friday June 12, with Juan Pablo Montoya posting the fastest time in both practice sessions. An additional practice session was held the next morning with Hélio Castroneves posting the best time.

Qualifying
23 cars entered for qualifications for the race. The format was for "shootout" qualification rounds later on Saturday afternoon to determine pole position and the starting positions for the rest of the field. Will Power secured the pole position with teammates Simon Pagenaud and Montoya landing the second and third positions for Team Penske, with Scott Dixon taking fourth position, completing the second row for Chip Ganassi Racing.

Race summary
At the start of the race, the track was still wet from a large thunderstorm which had moved through the area just before the start. As a result, all the cars started out on wet tires. Pole driver Will Power held the lead for the first 30 laps, with Simon Pagenaud trying to overtake him several times, until he pitted under the first of the race's two full course cautions, which came out due to James Jakes having minor contact and stalling at Turn 5. As Power pitted, the lead passed on to Penske teammate Hélio Castroneves. Castroneves held the lead until the second full course caution, when debris from Stefano Coletti's car was left on circuit at Turn 8. Josef Newgarden took the lead before it passed to CFH Racing teammate Luca Filippi on lap 58, before Tony Kanaan took the lead on lap 60. Three laps later, Castroneves re-took the lead which he held for four laps. After pitting, the lead fell to rookie Rodolfo González who held the lead for five laps as Newgarden and Filippi battled for second position. Gonzalez was ultimately forced to pit for fuel which handed the lead back to Newgarden. Newgarden held the lead until the checkered flag, to take his second victory of 2015. Filippi followed him home in second, to record CFH Racing's first 1–2 finish, with Castroneves taking third for Team Penske.

Race results

Championship standings after the race

Drivers' standings

Manufacturer standings

 Note: Only the top five positions are included.

Media

Television
The race was broadcast live by NBCSN in the United States and by Sportsnet on City and Sportsnet One in Canada. The event was also televised internationally by ESPN's ESPN Player across Europe, the Middle East and Africa.

Radio
The race was broadcast on radio by the IndyCar Radio Network and simulcast on Sirius / XM satellite radio and IndyCar.com.

Support race results

References

External links 

 
 IndyCar Toronto event page
 IndyCar Radio 2015 Toronto Race Broadcast

Honda Indy Toronto
Honda Indy Toronto
Honda Indy Toronto
Honda Indy Toronto
Indy Toronto